Jeffrey T. Pennington is a major general in the United States Air Force who serves as deputy commander of the Air Force Reserve Command since August 2022. He commanded the Fourth Air Force from April 2020 to August 2022.

Dates of promotion

References

Living people
Kansas State University alumni
Recipients of the Legion of Merit
United States Air Force generals
United States Air Force personnel of the Gulf War
Year of birth missing (living people)